Joseph Fletcher was an American ethicist.

Joseph Fletcher may also refer to:

 Joseph Fletcher (historian) (1934–1984), American historian of China and Central Asia
 Joseph Fletcher (statistician) (1813–1852), English statistical writer
 Joseph Horner Fletcher (1823–1890), West Indies-born Methodist minister of English descent 
 Joseph James Fletcher (1850–1926), Australian biologist
 Joseph M. Fletcher (1831–1882), attorney, civic leader, and government land agent in the Washington Territory
 Joseph O. Fletcher (1920–2008), American Air Force pilot and polar researcher
 J. S. Fletcher (1863–1935), British journalist and crime fiction writer
 Joseph Fletcher (died 1915) (1838–1915), fisherman, friend of poet Edward FitzGerald